Hugo Bueno may refer to:

Hugo Bueno (footballer, born 1992), Mexican football midfielder
Hugo Bueno (footballer, born 2002), Spanish football defender for Wolves